George John Barker (born 26 September 1991) is an English semi-professional footballer who plays as forward for AFC Portchester.

Barker has played in the Football League for Brighton & Hove Albion, Barnet, Newport County, Tranmere Rovers and Swindon Town.

Career
After youth spells at AC Fareham and Southampton, Barker joined Brighton & Hove Albion's youth team in 2008 and signed his first professional contract in 2010. He was on the bench for Brighton's 5–1 win over Barnsley in August 2012. In November 2012 he joined Barnet on loan deadline day. He made his debut at home to AFC Wimbledon on 8 December 2012, which was the only appearance he made for the Bees before his loan spell expired on 5 January.

He made his debut for Brighton on 12 March 2013, coming on as a 78th-minute substitute for Dean Hammond in a 2–1 loss away at Barnsley.

On 22 November 2013, Barker joined Newport County on loan until 1 January 2014 but only made two substitute appearances.

On 7 January 2014, Barker signed for Swindon Town on an eighteen-month contract for an undisclosed fee. Barker played only 13 league games for Town and was released at the end of his contract, which also included a loan spell with Tranmere Rovers.

Barker later played for Gosport Borough, Havant & Waterlooville, Salisbury and Staines Town before re-joining Gosport Borough in December 2018.

In June 2020 Barker signed for Southern League Division One side Moneyfields.

In the summer of 2021, Barker joined Wessex League side AFC Portchester.

Career statistics

Club

References

External links

George Barker at Aylesbury United
Profile at Wessex League

1991 births
Living people
Footballers from Portsmouth
Association football forwards
English footballers
Brighton & Hove Albion F.C. players
Lewes F.C. players
Barnet F.C. players
Newport County A.F.C. players
Swindon Town F.C. players
Tranmere Rovers F.C. players
Havant & Waterlooville F.C. players
Gosport Borough F.C. players
Salisbury F.C. players
Staines Town F.C. players
English Football League players
National League (English football) players
Isthmian League players
Southern Football League players
A.F.C. Portchester players
Wessex Football League players